Ockrent is a surname. Notable people with the surname include:

 Christine Ockrent (born 1944), Belgian journalist
 Mike Ockrent (1946–1999), British stage director

See also
 Okrent